The National Restaurant Association is a restaurant industry business association in the United States, representing more than 380,000 restaurant locations. It also operates the National Restaurant Association Educational Foundation. The association was founded in 1919 and is headquartered in Washington, D.C.

Lobbying
The National Restaurant Association, widely referred to as "the other NRA" to distinguish itself from National Rifle Association, which shares the initialism, is a powerful lobbying force in Washington, DC and in state capitals. The association advocates to retain the minimum wage in the United States as well as laws requiring paid sick leave. In July 2013, it boasted that it had successfully lobbied against raises in the minimum wage, in part or in full, in 27 of 29 states and blocked paid sick leave legislation in 12 states. It also takes credit for halting any increase in the federal minimum wage for tipped employees, which has remained at $2.13 per hour since 1991. (The federal "basic combined cash & tip minimum wage rate" is $7.25 per hour).

The NRA supported the Fighting Hunger Incentive Act of 2014 (H.R. 4719; 113th Congress), a bill that would amend the Internal Revenue Code to make permanent extend and to expand certain expired provisions that provided an enhanced tax deduction for businesses that donated their food inventory to charitable organizations. The NRA argued that "the deduction for charitable donation of food inventory is a critical tool in alleviating hunger" because it "encourages donating the food to charity, by helping to offset the costs associated with preserving, storing and transporting the extra food."

The NRA opposed the National Labor Relations Board's joint employer standard, but was unable to affect a change in legislation repealing the standard.

Other programs
The National Restaurant Association develops food safety training and certification program for restaurant employees. It also offers scholarships to foodservice and hospitality management and culinary students through NRAEF.  It also created and runs ProStart, a national culinary and restaurant management program for high school students . The NRA also presents a series of awards, including the Faces of Diversity, the American Dream Awards, and the Restaurant Neighbor Award.

It runs an annual restaurant and hospitality industry trade show in the US, in Chicago, and conducts research about the country's restaurant industry. For instance, it states that the restaurant industry in the US in 2021 employs 14.5 million Americans (up from 12.5 million in 2012), with sales in 2021 at $799 billion (up from $632 billion in 2012).

The National Restaurant Association also helps restaurant owners increase their environmental sustainability efforts.

The National Restaurant Association teamed up with Healthy Dining to launch Kids LiveWell, a program that helps restaurants increase healthful options on kids' menus and makes it easy for parents to find those options when dining out.

The association works closely with its state restaurant and hospitality association partners and provides its members with tools and solutions to improve their business. It also organizes conferences and networking events for its members. There are six membership categories: Restaurant, Allied, Faculty, Student, Nonprofit, and International.

The association lobbies for the restaurant and foodservice industry and represents the industry on Capitol Hill.  It was the largest food and beverage political action committee contributor to both the U.S. Democratic and Republican Parties in the 2004 election cycle.

The association is actively opposing the lowering of the federal blood alcohol content limit from .08% to .05% 

In May 2010 the Healthy Weight Commitment Foundation with 16 major food companies, including Mars Inc., Coca-Cola, and General Mills, with the aim of removing 1.5 trillion calories from consumers and the food chain. The goal was surpassed with 6.4 trillion calories removed instead (four times the amount).

Notable people
 Biff Naylor, past president
 Dawn Sweeney, president and chief executive officer, 2007–2019
 Doron Jensen, past president of the Minnesota Restaurant Association, 2000–2001
 Herman Cain, president, 1996–1999
 Marvin Irby, interim CEO, 2020–present
 Ransom M. Callicott, association president, 1949
 Richard Brennan, Sr., board member, affiliated with Brennan Family Restaurants, based in New Orleans
 Victor Rosellini (1915–2003), past president

See also
 National Registry of Food Safety Professionals

References

External links
National Restaurant Association website

1919 establishments in the United States
Food and drink in the United States
Food industry trade groups
 
Non-profit organizations based in Washington, D.C.
Organizations established in 1919